Accidental Heroes may refer to:

 Accidental Heroes (TV series), a 2020 Australian television series
 Accidental Heroes, a novel by Danielle Steel